Larches are deciduous conifers in the genus Larix, of the family Pinaceae (subfamily Laricoideae). Larches are among the dominant plants in the boreal forests of Siberia and Canada. Although they are conifers, larches are deciduous trees that lose their needles in the autumn.

Etymology
The English name Larch ultimately derives from the Latin "larigna," named after the ancient settlement of Larignum. The story of its naming was preserved by Vitruvius:

It is worth while to know how this wood was discovered. The divine Caesar, being with his army in the neighbourhood of the Alps, and having ordered the towns to furnish supplies, the inhabitants of a fortified stronghold there, called Larignum, trusting in the natural strength of their defences, refused to obey his command. So the general ordered his forces to the assault. In front of the gate of this stronghold there was a tower, made of beams of this wood laid in alternating directions at right angles to each other, like a funeral pyre, and built high, so that they could drive off an attacking party by throwing stakes and stones from the top. When it was observed that they had no other missiles than stakes, and that these could not be hurled very far from the wall on account of the weight, orders were given to approach and to throw bundles of brushwood and lighted torches at this outwork. These the soldiers soon got together.

The flames soon kindled the brushwood which lay about that wooden structure and, rising towards heaven, made everybody think that the whole pile had fallen. But when the fire had burned itself out and subsided, and the tower appeared to view entirely uninjured, Caesar in amazement gave orders that they should be surrounded with a palisade, built beyond the range of missiles. So the townspeople were frightened into surrendering, and were then asked where that wood came from which was not harmed by fire. They pointed to trees of the kind under discussion, of which there are very great numbers in that vicinity. And so, as that stronghold was called Larignum, the wood was called larch.

Description and distribution

The tallest species, Larix occidentalis, can reach . The larch's tree crown is sparse and the branches are brought horizontal to the stem, even if some species have them characteristically pendulous. Larches are among the few deciduous conifers, which are usually evergreen. Other deciduous conifers include the golden larch Pseudolarix amabilis, the dawn redwood Metasequoia glyptostroboides, the Chinese swamp cypress Glyptostrobus pensilis and the bald cypresses in the genus Taxodium.

The male flowers (small cones) are orange-yellowish and fall after pollination. Those native to northern regions have small cones with short bracts, with more southerly species tending to have longer cones, often with exserted bracts, with the longest cones and bracts produced by the southernmost species, in the Himalayas. The seeds are winged.
The larches are streamlined trees, the root system are broad and deep and the bark is finely cracked and wrinkled in irregular plaques. The wood is bicolor, with salmon pink heartwood and yellowish white sapwood.

The chromosome number is 2n = 24, similar to that of most of the other trees of the family Pinaceae.

The genus Larix is present in all the temperate-cold zones of the northern hemisphere, from North America to northern Siberia passing through Europe, mountainous China and Japan. The larches are important forest trees of Russia, Central Europe, United States and Canada. They require a cool and fairly humid climate and for this reason they are found in the mountains of the temperate zones, while in the northernmost boreal zones ones they are also found in the plain. At gen. Larix belong to the trees that go further north than all, reaching in the North America and Siberia the tundra and polar ice. The larches are pioneer species not very demanding towards the soil and they are very long-lived trees. They live in pure or mixed forests together with other conifers or more rarely broad-leaved trees.

Species and taxonomy
In the past, the cone bract length was often used to divide the larches into two sections (sect. Larix with short bracts, and sect. Multiserialis with long bracts), but genetic evidence does not support this division, pointing instead to a genetic divide between Old World and New World species, with the cone and bract size being merely adaptations to climatic conditions. More recent genetic studies have proposed three groups within the genus, with a primary division into North American and Eurasian species, and a secondary division of the Eurasian into northern short-bracted species and southern long-bracted species; there is some dispute over the position of Larix sibirica, a short-bracted species which is placed in the short-bracted group by some of the studies and the long-bracted group by others. The genus Larix belongs to the subfamily Laricoideae, which also includes the genera Pseudotsuga and Cathaya.

There are eleven (or ten, see L. czekanowskii) accepted species of larch subdivided on the basis of the most recent phylogenetic investigations:

North American species 

 Larix laricina (Du Roi) K. Koch – Tamarack or American larch. Parts of Alaska and throughout Canada and the northern United States from the eastern Rocky Mountains to the Atlantic shore.
 Larix lyallii Parl. – Subalpine larch. Mountains of northwest United States and southwest Canada, at very high altitude.
 Larix occidentalis Nutt. – Western larch. Mountains of northwest United States and southwest Canada, at lower altitudes (Pacific Northwest).

Eurasian species

Northern Eurasian species with short bracts 
 Larix decidua  (syn. L. europaea D.C.) – European larch; mountains of central Europe
 Larix sibirica  – Siberian larch. Plains of western Siberia
 Larix gmelinii  (syn. L. dahurica) – Dahurian larch; Plains of central and eastern Siberia
 Larix kaempferi  (syn. L. leptolepis) – Japanese larch; Mountains of central Japan
 Larix × czekanowskii  – Uncertain; its origin could be hybrid

Southern Euroasiatic species with long bracts 

 Larix potaninii Batalin – Chinese larch. Mountains of southwestern China (Sichuan, northern Yunnan).
 Larix mastersiana Rehder & E.H.Wilson – Masters' larch. Mountains of western China.
 Larix griffithii Hook.f. (syn. L. griffithiana) – Himalayan larch. Mountains of the eastern Himalayas.

Hybrids
Most if not all of the species can be hybridised in cultivation.
Currently-accepted hybrids are:

 Larix × lubarskii 
 Larix × maritima 
 Larix × polonica 

A well-known hybrid, the Dunkeld larch Larix × marschlinsii, arose more or less simultaneously in Switzerland and Scotland when L. decidua and L. kaempferi hybridised when planted together, is still treated as unresolved. Larix × stenophylla  is another probable hybrid still unresolved.

Larch is used as a food plant by the larvae of a number of Lepidoptera species — see list of Lepidoptera that feed on larches.

Ecology

Larches are associated with a number of mycorrhizal fungal species, including some species which primarily or only associate with larch. One of the most prominent of these species is the larch bolete Suillus grevillei.

Diseases
Larches are prone to the fungal canker disease Lachnellula ssp. (larch canker); this is particularly a problem on sites prone to late spring frosts, which cause minor injuries to the tree allowing entry to the fungal spores. In Canada, this disease was first detected in 1980 and is particularly harmful to an indigenous species larch, the tamarack, killing both young and mature trees.
Larches are also vulnerable to Phytophthora ramorum. In late 2009 the disease was first found in Japanese larch trees in the English counties of Devon, Cornwall and Somerset, and has since spread to the south-west of Scotland.
In August 2010 the disease was found in Japanese larch trees in counties Waterford and Tipperary in Ireland and in 2013 in the Afan Forest Park in south Wales.
Laricifomes officinalis is another mushroom found in Europe, North America and northern Asia that causes internal wood rot. It is almost exclusive guest of the gen. Larix. Other diseases are given by mushrooms, fungal rusts, bacteria and insects.

Uses
Larch wood is valued for its tough, waterproof and durable qualities. Top quality knot-free timber is in great demand for building yachts and other small boats, for exterior cladding of buildings, and interior paneling. The timber is somewhat resistant to rot when in contact with the ground, and historically was used as posts and in fencing. However, European Standard EN 350-2 lists larch as slightly to moderately durable; this would make it unsuitable for ground contact use without preservative in temperate climates, and would give it a limited life as external cladding without coatings.

The hybrid Dunkeld larch is widely grown as a timber crop in Northern Europe, valued for its fast growth and disease resistance.

Larch on oak was the traditional construction method for Scottish fishing boats in the 19th century.

Larch has also been used in herbal medicine; see Bach flower remedies and Arabinogalactan for details.

Often, in Eurasian shamanism, the "world tree" is depicted as specifically a larch tree.  Planted on borders with birch, both tree species were used in pagan cremations.

Gallery

References

Further reading
 
  Quote from p. 729.
 Phillips, D. H., & Burdekin, D. A. (1992). Diseases of Forest and Ornamental Trees. Macmillan .

External links
 
 Larix images at the Arnold Arboretum of Harvard University Plant Image Database
 Friedman, William (Ned). "Larch cones in spring." Posts from the Collection, Arnold Arboretum of Harvard University, 2 April 2016. Accessed 26 May 2020.
Rose, Nancy. "Not All Conifers are Evergreen." Arnold Arboretum of Harvard University website, 6 January 2016. Accessed 26 May 2020.
"Snow Scenes, winter, larches 1977." Library Featured Images, Arnold Arboretum of Harvard University website, 21 November 2019. Accessed 26 May 2020.

 
 

Larix
Deciduous conifers
Taxa named by Philip Miller